The 1926 Campeonato Paulista was the 25th season of São Paulo's top association football league. Two championships were disputed that season, each by a different league (APEA and LAF).

LAF Championship

In the edition organized by the LAF (Liga dos Amadores de Futebol), from June 6 to November 7. Paulistano won the title for the 9th time. no teams were relegated and the top scorer was Filó with 16 goals.

System
The championship was disputed in a double round-robin system, with the team with the most points winning the title.

Championship

APEA Championship

In the edition organized by the APEA (Associação Paulista de Esportes Atléticos) from April 25 to October 17. Palestra Itália won the title for the 2nd time. no teams were relegated and the top scorer was Araken with 13 goals.

System
The championship was disputed in a single round-robin system, with the team with the most points winning the title.

Championship

References

Campeonato Paulista seasons
Paulista